Abdulkarim Abdulkarim Abdulla Fardan (born 25 April 1992) is a Bahraini footballer who plays as a goalkeeper for Riffa and the Bahrain national team.

Career
Fardan was included in Bahrain's squad for the 2019 AFC Asian Cup in the United Arab Emirates.

Career statistics

International

References

External links
 
 
 

1992 births
Living people
Bahraini footballers
Bahrain international footballers
Association football goalkeepers
Malkiya Club players
Riffa SC players
Bahraini Premier League players
2019 AFC Asian Cup players